Mick Bates may refer to:

Mick Bates (Australian footballer) (born 1949), Australian rules footballer
Mick Bates (English footballer) (1947–2021), English footballer
Mick Bates (Welsh politician) (born 1947), Welsh politician
Mick Bates (West Virginia politician) (born 1970), American politician

See also
Michael Bates (disambiguation)